Elements of Surprise is a live album by saxophonist Anthony Braxton and trombonist George E. Lewis recorded at the Moers Festival in Germany in 1976 and originally released on the Moers Music label.

Track listing
 "Composition 64" (Anthony Braxton) - 9:50
 "Ornithology" (Braxton/Charlie Parker) - 6:50
 "Composition 65" (Braxton) - 2:19
 "Music for Trombone and B♭ Soprano" (George Lewis) - 18:18

Personnel
Anthony Braxton - alto saxophone, soprano saxophone, clarinet
George Lewis - trombone

References

Moers Music live albums
Anthony Braxton live albums
George E. Lewis live albums
1978 live albums